Frączki may refer to:
Frączki, Bartoszyce County, Poland
Frączki, Olsztyn County, Poland